Politics of Saskatchewan relate to the Canadian federal political system, along with the other Canadian provinces. Saskatchewan has a lieutenant-governor, who is the representative of the Crown in right of Saskatchewan; premier, Scott Moe, leading the Cabinet; and a unicameral legislature.

Political History

Until the Cooperative Commonwealth Federation

The Saskatchewan Liberal Party was the province's main centre-right party for several decades early in Saskatchewan's existence, ruling from 1905–29 and from 1934–44. James T.M. Anderson formed a Conservative government (which ruled from 1930–34) by an alliance with the Progressives in the provincial legislature.

In 1935, under the watch of Liberal Premier James Garfield Gardiner, the On-to-Ottawa Trekkers, and citizens of Regina clashed with the Royal Canadian Mounted Police (RCMP) during the Regina Riot.

In 1944, Tommy Douglas became premier of the first avowedly socialist regional government in North America. Most of Douglas' MLAs (Members of the Legislative Assembly) represented rural and small-town ridings. The Cooperative Commonwealth Federation (CCF) government implemented provincial Medicare, billed at the time as government-funded mandatory universal medical insurance. This model would later be adopted across Canada. In 1961, Douglas left provincial politics to become the first leader of the federal New Democratic Party.

Recent history (1964 to present)

During most of the postwar period, the CCF and its successor, the New Democratic Party have dominated provincial politics with Douglas, Allan Blakeney, and Roy Romanow all serving long periods as premier and becoming national figures.  Urbanization since the Second World War has altered the provincial economy away from its agricultural basis, and there has been a steady migration from farms to cities and towns.  There was a corresponding shift in the NDP's focus from rural to urban concerns, so that the NDP gradually represented voters in cities and towns.

The Saskatchewan Liberal Party regained power in 1964. The Progressive Conservatives led by Grant Devine gradually replaced the Liberals as the NDP's main rival and soundly defeated the New Democrats in 1982.  But the Conservatives' popularity plummeted after running up large deficits and being closely aligned with the Brian Mulroney-led federal PC government; Devine was defeated in 1991.  Several PC MLAs, including some cabinet ministers, were convicted for misappropriation of public funds, and the PC Party itself went into suspension, running only paper candidates from 1999 to 2007.

Contemporary politics

In the 1990s the centre-right Saskatchewan Party was formed, with four Progressive Conservatives and four Liberals joining together. It served as the official opposition for most of that decade, and was elected to form the government in the 2007 election.

Today, the official opposition in the province is the Saskatchewan New Democratic Party. The current premier of Saskatchewan is Scott Moe of the Saskatchewan Party.

In recent years, Saskatchewan has been characterized by an extreme urban-rural split.  This was evident as early as the 1986 election, when the NDP won a majority of the popular vote but was consigned to opposition for another term due to winning only nine seats outside of Regina and Saskatoon.  Ironically, the NDP had begun as the voice of rural discontent.  Today, however, rural Saskatchewan is considered one of the most conservative areas of Canada, particularly on social issues.  Some areas are as conservative as areas in neighbouring Alberta. The NDP draw most of their support from Regina, Saskatoon and Moose Jaw.  The Saskatchewan Party has swept all of the rural ridings in southern and central Saskatchewan since its first election in 1999, but was unable to win government until the Saskatchewan Party softened its image to appeal more to voters in the cities.

Federal politics

Nationally notable federal politicians from Saskatchewan include Prime Minister John Diefenbaker and CCF/NDP leaders Major Coldwell and Tommy Douglas.

Currently, all 14 federal constituencies in Saskatchewan are occupied by members of the Conservative Party of Canada as of the 2019 Federal Election. While Regina and Saskatoon have roughly double the population of an urban riding in Canada, the ridings based in those cities also included large blocks of rural territory.  However, a redistribution in 2013, taking effect in 2015, resulted in the Regina and Saskatoon ridings losing most of their rural areas and two New Democrats being elected in those cities.  Regina and Saskatoon have each been split between three ridings located almost entirely within the city limits.

Aboriginal politics

Saskatchewan, when compared to other provinces, has a large Aboriginal population. As of the 2006 Canadian census, residents identifying as First Nations, Métis, or Inuit comprised 14.8% of the overall population. Unlike neighbouring Alberta, Saskatchewan does not have land set aside as Métis Settlements (see Métis in Alberta).

Saskatchewan also has a rich history of Aboriginal political leaders of national prominence. First Nations leaders include Walter Dieter, Noel Starblanket, and the highly controversial David Ahenakew. First Nations are represented in the Federation of Sovereign Indigenous Nations. In addition, each First Nation has its own government band structure. The majority of Saskatchewan First Nations are Cree although Saulteaux, Assiniboine, Dakota, and Dene bands predominate in some areas.

Métis leaders of national importance include Malcolm Norris, Jim Sinclair and Clément Chartier. Métis people in the province take part in the Métis Nation - Saskatchewan. The Métis nation is represented on the community level by Métis Locals, structured similarly to trade union locals.

In 1982 the Aboriginal People's Party ran ten electoral candidates for the provincial legislature but received little support.

Municipal politics

On the municipal level, non-Indian reserve, or non-Crown Land, in Saskatchewan is divided into rural municipalities and urban municipalities. Rural Municipalities have a corporate structure for dealing with larger governments known as SARM: the Saskatchewan Association of Rural Municipalities. Unlike neighbouring Alberta, Saskatchewan does not have Municipal Districts.

See also

 History of Saskatchewan
 List of premiers of Saskatchewan
 List of Saskatchewan general elections
 List of political parties in Saskatchewan
 First Nations in Saskatchewan
 Politics of Canada
 Political culture of Canada
 Council of the Federation

References

External links
Government of Saskatchewan

 
Indigenous politics in Canada